Angela Nanetti is an Italian writer. She was awarded the Baltvilks International Prize in Children’s Literature and Book Art, for the book My Grandfather was a Cherry Tree in 2019. The book was made into an animated short film by directors Olga Poliektova and Tatiana Poliektova in 2015.

References

Italian women writers
Italian women children's writers
Living people
Year of birth missing (living people)
Place of birth missing (living people)
Italian children's writers